The 2010 Lithuanian A Lyga was the 21st season of top-tier football in Lithuania. The season began on 20 March 2010 and ended on 14 November 2010. Ekranas were the defending champions and retained the title. This was their sixth league title and third in a row.

Teams

Stadia, locations and coaches

League table

Results
Every team will play each other three times for a total of 30 games.

Note: All Vėtra results listed below were annulled after the club was expelled from championship. They are listed here for information purposes. Matches which were to be competed after Vėtra's exemption have been shaded.

First and second rounds

Third round

Goalscorers
Including matches played on 14 November 2010; Source: Lietuvos futbolo statistika

Top goalscorers

References

LFF Lyga seasons
1
Lith
Lith